Tiago Marques Rezende (born March 3, 1988 in Jataí), known as Tiago Marques, is a Brazilian footballer who plays as a forward for Ituano.

Career statistics

References

External links

1988 births
Living people
Brazilian footballers
Brazilian expatriate footballers
Association football forwards
Campeonato Brasileiro Série B players
Campeonato Brasileiro Série C players
K League 1 players
Esporte Clube XV de Novembro (Piracicaba) players
Comercial Futebol Clube (Ribeirão Preto) players
Clube Atlético Sorocaba players
Grêmio Barueri Futebol players
Associação Ferroviária de Esportes players
Botafogo Futebol Clube (SP) players
Esporte Clube Juventude players
Jeju United FC players
Associação Atlética Ponte Preta players
Esporte Clube Água Santa players
Expatriate footballers in South Korea
Brazilian expatriate sportspeople in South Korea
Sportspeople from Goiás